From Here to Eternity is the debut full-length album and second overall release by Japanese screamo band Envy. It was released in Japan in 1998 by the label H.G. Fact in both CD and LP formats. As has been noted by reviewers, this album shows a logical progression from the previous one, and indicates to the listener which direction the band will take their sound in the future.

Track listing
"Limitation" – 4:12
"Trembled" – 4:13
"A Vicious Circle, Again" – 1:24
"Compensation" – 4:08
"Off" – 2:40
"Crusaders" – 1:59
"For You Who Died" – 3:05
"Black Past" – 1:54
"Grey Wind" – 4:26
"Carved Numbers" – 3:38
"444 Words" – 2:15

Personnel
Manabu Nakagawa – Bass
Dairoku Seki – Drums
Nobukata Kawai – Guitar
Masahiro Tobita – Guitar
Tetsuya Fukagawa – Vocals
Eiji Tani – Engineering

External links
Official Envy webpage at Sonzai Records
Album page at H.G. Fact (Translated from Japanese)
From Here To Eternity at Discogs
Envy's page on Temporary Residence Limited

References

Envy (band) albums
1998 albums